Coleophora imbecilla is a moth of the family Coleophoridae. It is found in Syria.

References

imbecilla
Moths described in 1952
Moths of the Middle East